León Cortés may refer to:

 León Cortés Castro (canton), a canton in San José Province, Costa Rica
 León Cortés Castro, politician from Costa Rica

See also
 Leon Còrdas
 Leone Cortese
 Leon Cortez